Arabic and Islamic names of Moon craters

 Abulfeda (crater)
 Abul Wafa (crater)
 Al-Bakri (crater)
 Al-Biruni (crater)

See also 
 List of Arabic star names

External links 
 
 Arabic & Islamic Crater-Names On The Moon